Cinematic Void is a monthly film screening series with live events in Los Angeles at the Los Feliz 3, the Egyptian Theatre, and the Aero Theatre through the American Cinematheque. Created by James Branscome in 2016 with the guidance of Beyond Fest programmer Grant Moninger, Cinematic Void screens strange, obscure, and cult films of all genres. Screening events often include clip shows, special guests, and contests.

Sub-series 
Cinematic Void has several themed sub-series: Camp Void, Voidentines, January Giallo, the Cinematic Void Up All Night virtual series, and programming during Beyond Fest.

Partners 
Cinematic Void is partnered with the American Cinematheque and has partnered with film distributors Severin Films, Arrow Video, and Vinegar Syndrome for film restoration premieres.

Podcast 
Cinematic Void has a dedicated podcast co-hosted by James Branscome and Nick Vance with special guests and in-depth discussions of cult and genre films.

See also 
 List of film festivals
 List of mobile movie screening clubs in Los Angeles
 American Cinematheque List of Regular Film Series

References

External links
Official website

Film festivals in Los Angeles
Fantasy and horror film festivals in the United States
Science fiction film festivals